The 2011–12 season was the Persepolis's 11th season in the Pro League, and their 29th consecutive season in the top division of Iranian Football. They competed in the Champions League.  They also competed in the Hazfi Cup but were eliminated by Esteghlal in the quarter-finals . Persepolis is captained by Ali Karimi.

Player

First team squad

Transfers

Summer transfers

In:

Out:

Winter transfers

In:

Out:

Competitions

Iran Pro League

Standings

Results summary

Results by round

Matches

Hazfi Cup

Matches

AFC Champions League

Group stage

Results and positions

Knockout stage

Friendly Matches

Pre Season

During Season

Velayat Cup

Statistics

Appearances

|-
|colspan="14"|Players who are currently out on loan/have left the club

|-
|}

[R] - Reserve team player

Top scorers
Includes all competitive matches. The list is sorted by shirt number when total goals are equal.

Last updated on 4 April 2012

Friendlies and Pre season goals are not recognized as competitive match goals.

Disciplinary record
Includes all competitive matches. Players with 1 card or more included only.

Last updated on 4 April 2012

Other information

See also

2011–12 Persian Gulf Cup
2011–12 Hazfi Cup
2012 AFC Champions League

References

External links
Iran Premier League Statistics
Persian League

2011-12
Iranian football clubs 2011–12 season